Santiago Vázquez is a village at the western limits of Montevideo Department in Uruguay.

Geography
It is located at the mouth of the river Río Santa Lucía towards the Río de la Plata,  from the centre of Montevideo.

History
It was given this name by a decree of 1912, in honor of a politician and co-founder of the Constitution of 1830. It was declared a "Pueblo" by decree Ley Nº 4.049 on 1 July 1912.

Population
In 2004, Santiago Vázquez had a population of 1,482 inhabitants.
 
Source: Instituto Nacional de Estadística de Uruguay

Features
It is surrounded by an ecologically important natural environment consisting of the coasts, beaches and hills. It has a natural port which is part of the river delta and includes 25.000 hectares of wetlands. During the first half of the 20th century the village was converted into a touristic centre, marked by the construction of the "Hotel de la Barra", the boat races, the yacht club and the parks "Parque Segunda República Española" and Parque Lecocq, which is also a zoo.
	
Santiago Vázquez is also known as "La Barra", from the rotary iron bridge of British construction which along with the modern bridge of Ruta 1, join Montedieo with the San José Department.

A little to the southwest of the village is situated the homonymous penitentiary facility.

Places of worship
 Parish Church of Our Lady of the Guard and St. Aloysius Gonzaga, Silvestre Ochoa 434 (Roman Catholic)

See also 
Paso de la Arena

References

External links 

Intendencia de Montevideo/Local development (Spanish)	
Club Alemán de Remo Monevideo (Spanish)
INE map of Santiago Vázquez

Barrios of Montevideo
Populated places in the Montevideo Department